A referendum on direct election of governors and vice governors was held in American Samoa on 31 August 1976.  Voters were asked to approve a proposal which permitted direct popular election of governors and lieutenant governors.  Turnout was low, but higher than previously at 24%.  At this referendum, the fourth time the same proposal had been put before voters, it was solidly passed and direct election of governors and their lieutenants began with the election the following year.

Results

References

Referendums in American Samoa
1976 in American Samoa
1976 referendums
Electoral reform referendums
20th-century referendums